was a popular figure in the Edo period. He was a bakuto (gamblers commonly seen as forerunners to the modern yakuza).

His story is mainly responsible for the romanticised "chivalrous bandit" or "Robin Hood" image in Japan. An example was when a village had a famine, he helped the village out.

He was publicly executed in 1850 for various crimes after a large man-hunt.

Chūji is depicted on a 1999 Japanese stamp.

See also 
 A Diary of Chuji's Travels (忠治旅日記 Chūji tabi nikki)
 Films based on his story in 1954, 1958 and 1960

References

External links 
 Wild Weird Realm history, folklore, and films of Chuji

People of Edo-period Japan
Japanese gamblers
1810 births
1851 deaths
Culture articles needing translation from Japanese Wikipedia